The Transcona Rangers change their name to the Winnipeg Rangers.

Regular season

Playoffs
Semi-Finals
Brandon defeated Braves 3-games-to-1
St. Boniface lost to Rangers 3-games-to-2
Turnbull Cup Championship
Brandon defeated Rangers 3-games-to-2 with 2 games tied
Western Memorial Cup Semi-Final
Brandon defeated Fort William Hurricanes (TBJHL) 4-games-to-none
Western Memorial Cup Final (Abbott Cup)
Brandon lost to Edmonton Oil Kings (CAHL) 4-games-to-3

Awards

All-Star Teams

References
Manitoba Junior Hockey League
Manitoba Hockey Hall of Fame
Hockey Hall of Fame
Winnipeg Free Press Archives
Brandon Sun Archives

MJHL
Manitoba Junior Hockey League seasons